Glenn Goosen (born 29 April 1982) is a former Zimbabwean cricketer. He was a left-handed batsman and a right-arm off-break bowler and wicket-keeper. He was born in Harare.

Goosen made four appearances for CFX Academy in the Logan Cup competition of 2001/02, batting in the upper-middle order. He recovered from his poor form in the first innings of the match to score a powerful 35 in the second innings, alongside opener Neetan Chouhan.

Goosen scored a half century in the second match against Mashonaland A, though their opponents powered their way to victory mostly courtesy of an innings of 180 from Mark Vermeulen. He followed this up with an unbeaten century in the next game.

Despite his form in the 2001/02 competition, he played just a single game in the following season's competition, having moved to Mashonaland. Goosen scored a duck in the first of only two innings he played for the team, though he took three catches from behind the wicket.

External links
Glenn Goosen at Cricket Archive 

1982 births
Living people
Zimbabwean people of British descent
White Zimbabwean sportspeople
Cricketers from Harare
Zimbabwean cricketers
Mashonaland cricketers
CFX Academy cricketers
Cambridgeshire cricketers
Wicket-keepers